Yanam is a legislative assembly constituency in the Union territory of Puducherry in India, covering the area of Yanam. Yanam assembly constituency was part of Puducherry (Lok Sabha constituency).

Member of the Assembly

Member of Representative Assembly of French India

 1946: Madimchetty Satianarayanamourty ; Kamichetty Sri Parassourama Varaprassada Rao Naidu,
 1951: Madimchetty Satianarayanamourty ; Canacala Tataya.

The de facto transfer of French settlements in India has happened on 1 November 1954. These four French settlements were organized as State of Pondicherry. Later, on 11 June 1955, The Government of India has dissolved the Representative Assembly by State of Pondicherry (Representative Assembly Decree Amendment) Order, 1955.

Member of Pondicherry Representative Assembly

 1955: Erra Jagannadha Rao (Congress); Kamichetty Sri Parassourama Varaprassada Rao Naidu (Congress).
 1959: Kanakalapeta constituency: Kamichetty Savithri (Ind.); Adiandhrapeta constituency: Kamichetty Sri Parassourama Varaprassada Rao Naidu (Ind.).

As the people aspired for a popular government, the Indian Parliament enacted The Union Territories Act, 1963 that came into force on 1 July 1963, and the pattern of government prevailing in the rest of the country was introduced in this territory. The Pondicherry Representative Assembly was converted into the Legislative Assembly of Pondicherry on 1 July 1963 as per Section 54(3) of The Union Territories Act, 1963 and its members were deemed to have been elected to the Assembly. Thus, the MLAs of Yanam to the First Legislvative Assembly (1963–1964) were Smt.Kamichetty Savithri and Shri Kamichetty Sri Parassourama Varaprassada Rao Naidu.

Member of Legislative Assembly
The elections for the Puducherry Legislative Assembly are held since 1964. Before the Elections to the Pondicherry Legislative Assembly were held in August 1964, the constituencies were delimited by the Delimitation Commission and the entire territory was divided into 30 single-member constituencies and 1 seat is allocated for Yanam region.

Election Results

Legislative Assembly

Assembly Elections 2021

Assembly Elections 1969

Pondicherry Representative Assembly

Assembly Elections 1964

Assembly Elections 1955

French India

Assembly Elections 1951

Assembly Elections 1946

See also
 Yanaon
 Representative Assembly of French India
 Pondicherry Representative Assembly

Notes

References

External links
 

Assembly constituencies of Puducherry
Yanam